R. J. McIntosh (born June 2, 1996) is an American football defensive end who is a free agent. He played college football at Miami (FL).

College career
McIntosh played at Miami from 2015 to 2017, recording 5.5 sacks. After his junior season in 2017, he decided to forgo his senior year and enter the 2018 NFL Draft.

Professional career

New York Giants
McIntosh was drafted by the New York Giants in the fifth round (139th overall) of the 2018 NFL Draft. He was placed on the reserve/non-football illness list on September 1, 2018, after being diagnosed with a thyroid condition at the NFL Combine. He was activated off NFI to the active roster on November 6, 2018. He was cut by the Giants on August 11, 2021.

New Orleans Saints
On August 12, 2021, McIntosh was claimed off waivers by the New Orleans Saints. He was released on August 31, 2021.

Green Bay Packers
On September 21, 2021, McIntosh signed with the practice squad of the Green Bay Packers.

Indianapolis Colts
On February 8, 2022, the Indianapolis Colts signed McIntosh to a one-year deal. He was waived on August 30, 2022.

Miami Dolphins
On November 21, 2022, McIntosh was signed to the Miami Dolphins practice squad.

Personal life
McIntosh is the brother of Deon McIntosh, who played running back for Notre Dame and Washington State.  The brothers played each other on November 11, 2017.  McIntosh is also the brother of Georgia running back Kenny McIntosh.

References

External links
Miami Hurricanes bio
New York Giants bio

1996 births
Living people
Players of American football from Fort Lauderdale, Florida
American football defensive tackles
Miami Hurricanes football players
New York Giants players
New Orleans Saints players
Green Bay Packers players
Indianapolis Colts players
Miami Dolphins players